Association football has been included in every Maccabiah Games as a men's competition sport.

Results

Men's tournament

Women's tournament

Medal table

Men's medal table
Includes Mandatory Palestine under Israel

References

 Official site
 RSSSF

 
Football
Recurring sporting events established in 1932
Football at multi-sport events